Edward Holland (17 November 1879 – 20 September 1960) was an Australian rules footballer who played with Geelong in the Victorian Football League (VFL).

Notes

External links 

1879 births
1960 deaths
Australian rules footballers from Victoria (Australia)
Geelong Football Club players